Kazumasa Nagai (in Japanese: 永井 一正, Nagai Kazumasa; Ōsaka, April 20, 1929) is a Japanese printmaker and graphic designer. He attended the University of the Arts in Tokyo to study sculpture, but had to stop due to health problems.

In 1964, he took part in documenta III, in Kassel.

He was a founding member of the Nippon Design Center (NDC)(1959), where he was its President from 1975 to 1986, Vice-President until 2001, and Senior Executive Advisor until today. 

Although his first works were abstract at the beginning, he changed for handmade designs of animals and plants in the 1980s. Some of his works appeared on the cover of LIFE.

His work is held in many museums, including the Fine Arts Museum of San Francisco, the National Gallery of Australia, the Museum of New Zealand, the British Museum, the University of Michigan Museum of Art, the Walker Art Center, the Stedelijk Museum Amsterdam, the National Museum of Contemporary Art in Tokyo, the Museum of Applied Arts and Sciences, and the Museum of Modern Art.

References and sources 

 documenta III. Internationale Ausstellung; Katalog: Band 1: Malerei und Skulptur; Band 2: Handzeichnungen; Band 3: Industrial Design, Graphik; Kassel/Colonia 1964

External links
 documentaarchiv in German
 Kazumasa Nagai Poster Exhibition, Ginza Graphic Gallery 2004

1929 births
Living people
Japanese printmakers
Japanese graphic designers
People from Osaka
Recipients of the Medal with Purple Ribbon
20th-century Japanese artists
20th-century printmakers